The Toledo subdivision is a rail line owned by CSX Transportation. This line is located in Ohio, running from Columbus to Toledo. The line serves factories such as Honda, Scottslawn, and International Paper. The railroad is a portion of the former Toledo and Ohio Central Railway, beginning at Stanley Yard (near Northwood, Ohio) and dead-ending just past Columbus.

Ohio railroads